Uppariguda is a village in Ranga Reddy district in Andhra Pradesh, India. It falls under Ibrahimpatnam mandal.

References

Villages in Ranga Reddy district